Allen White Tiffany (July 8, 1827 – February 17, 1903) was an American politician in the state of Washington. He served in the Washington House of Representatives from 1891 to 1893.

References

Members of the Washington House of Representatives
1827 births
1903 deaths
People from Peru, Massachusetts
People from Ferndale, Washington
19th-century American politicians